San Bernardo Airport  is an airport serving the city of Santa Cruz de Mompox, or Mompós, in the Bolívar Department of Colombia.

The runway length includes  overruns at each end.

See also

Transport in Colombia
List of airports in Colombia

References

External links
OpenStreetMap - Mompós
OurAirports - Mompós
SkyVector - Mompós
Mompós Airport

Airports in Colombia